Battle of Alcantara may refer to:

 Battle of Alcântara (1580), during the Portuguese dynastic crisis of the 16th century
 Battle of Alcántara (1706), between British and French forces during the War of the Spanish Succession
 Battle of Alcántara (1809), during the Peninsular War